Government Ashek Mahmud College, Jamalpur is an institution of higher education in Bangladesh, located in the Jamalpur District.

History 
In 1946, the journey of the present government Ashek Mahmud College, named Jamalpur College, was started. The history behind this path is old. After establishing the subdivision of Jamalpur in 1845, under the supervision of a growing student of the Jamkhpur sub-divisional administration, RC Datta and some energetic people took the initiative to set up a college in the Jamalpur city area. On this occasion, the effective committee was formed in 1940 at a meeting of the Coordination Reading Club. An initial fund was formed by collecting commissions from different individuals from the committee. In another meeting, every union president was paid a sum of 200 takas. not only that, In this area, the common people also came forward to set up colleges and assisted in providing maximum support. As a result, the primary funding for setting up colleges is ensured. On 10 June 1941, the decision to the establishment of a college at the government at Itkhola (Koir's Bill) was taken at the meeting of the Provincial Work Committee and the decision was taken to apply to the government for the establishment of the college to donate it to itchola college. But in 1943, the work of establishing the college was temporarily halted due to a severe famine. The meeting of the organizing committee of the college was held on 8 December 1944, and in that meeting, it was decided to apply to the University of Calcutta to receive the college affiliation. After the payment of 3813 / - Treasury shipment on 29/06/1945, after the necessary procedure, Jamalpur College Govt. Has got a long-term lease of thirty-one-acre land. At that time, the public fair in Jamalpur was held from the college for 20, The money was collected at Tk. 000 / - and the dream of establishing the college with the donation money of the district committee started. After the establishment of the college, Alhaj Ashik Mahmud Talukdar, a well-known child of Madarganj, donated 40,000 rupees and in 1947, Jamalpur College was renamed Ashik Mahmud College. In 1979, by issuing a notification, the nationalization of a college in each subdivision town was also nationalized under that year. In addition to the donor Alhaj ashk Mahmud Talukder, people from various localities and people from Jamalpur assisted in the development of the college. As a result, 44.20 acres of land are available for the college in support of various people. In the year 1947, Jamalpur College was renamed Ashik Mahmud College. In 1979, by issuing a notification, the nationalization of a college in each subdivision town was also nationalized under that year. In addition to the donor Alhaj ashk Mahmud Talukder, people from various localities and people from Jamalpur assisted in the development of the college. As a result, 44.20 acres of land are available for the college in support of various people. In the year 1947, Jamalpur College was renamed Ashik Mahmud College. In 1979, by issuing a notification, the nationalization of a college in each subdivision town was also nationalized under that year. In addition to the donor Alhaj ashk Mahmud Talukder, people from various localities and people from Jamalpur assisted in the development of the college. As a result, 44.20 acres of land are available for the college in support of various people.

Initially, the college office was unavailable due to its establishment, then the union board office was located in the present arts. From there, teachers used to conduct class categorization in college. Within a few months of receiving a large grant, the college office was transferred from the Union Board office to the current college campus. Tunnels and Half Buildings are constructed on the west side of the main hall and the west side of the main hall for the office and class management. In the last few years, these tin cans be inefficient and unusable. In 1962, a two-part academic building was built on the eastern side of the main road. Besides, in 1965, another three-storied building was constructed in the east-west with the two-storied building 1965, with the efforts of dedicated devotees of the then Ziaurat Ali Miah and other prominent people. This is why the two buildings got together in one building. At present, this building is called the main building or college of kalabhana Known. No academic or administrative building was built in college for many years. In 1993, the building, known as the current Science Hall, was built by the Facilitative Department for the honors and Masters's class classes. In 1994, the then Prime Minister Begum Khaleda Zia inaugurated the building. After the completion of the construction work of the current business school in the same year, a few honors departments were transferred there. The buildings for the honors and masters course classes are allocated for the subjects of science and accountancy and management departments are kept in the new building. The subjects of kalashakha are given at the mainstay or kalabhana. In 2005–2006, a large auditorium was created in the college by the then MP Mr. Mirza Azam. It was inaugurated on 17 February, In 2007. A four-storied building (administrative cum test building) was built in the year of the present government. Jamalpur-5 MP Mr. Rezaul Karim Hira and State Minister for Jute and Textiles Ministry Alhaj Mirza Azam inaugurated the building on 17.10.2015.

Since the establishment of the college, the housing crisis among teachers and students was strong. Hostels can not be constructed according to the student population. Hostel for the students was not long in the long run. Accommodation can not be arranged for teachers and employees. As a result, several messes were developed in the adjacent areas of the college. Most students, teachers, and employees live in rent for this mess or lodging.

In 1947 a hostel was built for the students considering the problem of coming to the students from distant places. The first built hostel is known as Inter Hostel. Although known as Inter Hostel, the name of the hostel is Panaullah Ahmad Muslim Hostel. The hostel was built after the intensive efforts of the then sub-divisional officer Panaullah, as it was named Panaullah Ahmad Muslim Hostel. In 1977, the whole hostel was burnt to ashes by fire due to fire from an electric short circuit. Subsequently, the hostel was collected in different ways and with the help of the government. In the middle of the hostel in 2015, there is a 70-feet-tall tinced semi-tilled house with 5 rooms on the south side. In this, the abandoned portion of the old times is again suitable for the living of the students. After the introduction of degree courses in the college in 1951, another hostel was built. It gets acquainted Name of the degree hostel. The hostel was built by the efforts of Principal Habibur Rahman and Sujayat Ali Miah. The degree hostel was the center of sports and cultural activities. Considering the advantages of the students during the construction of the hostel, a big pond was reformed and a bath was built for bathing. The small umbrella and bench for the seats were placed in the pond. The beauty of the soil from the big pond and its beauty is also done at this time. In 1993, when a college honors course was introduced, a separate hostel was built for the students of Honors in front of the big pond at the northwest end of the college. Built-in 1994, this hostel is known as Honor's Hostel. Considering the big pond was reformed and a bath was built for bathing. The small umbrella and bench for the seats were placed in the pond. The beauty of the soil from the big pond and its beauty is also done at this time. In 1993, when a college honors course was introduced, a separate hostel was built for the students of Honors in front of the big pond at the northwest end of the college. Built-in 1994, this hostel is known as Honor's Hostel. Considering the big pond was reformed and a bath was built for bathing. The small umbrella and bench for the seats were placed in the pond. The beauty of the soil from the big pond and its beauty is also done at this time. In 1993, when a college honors course was introduced, a separate hostel was built for the students of Honors in front of the big pond at the northwest end of the college. Built-in 1994, this hostel is known as Honor's Hostel.

In the second batch of the college establishment, some students are requested to keep the students of the college in the current government girl high school students' college. In the long run, there was no Hostel hostel for the college till the earlier of independence, the students of the college were college. Residential students of the government's Zaheda Sufi Women College were also staying at the same hostel. Until 2006, no separate girl student was created to stay in college. After a long sixty years, the residential problem of the students was solved a little bit, as a result of the construction of a four-storied daughter-in-girl in 2007. To ease the housing problems of the students, under the initiative of Principal Professor Mujahid Billah Faruki and State Minister for Textiles Alhaj Mirza Azam, the work of constructing a new girl student is already completed in January 2016.

Tinted residential colonies were built in front of the present student council in 1973 (?) To resolve the teacher's housing problem. Currently, there is no teacher left in the place of abandonment and inability to live. In 1995, a small double-dormitory was built for teachers in the adjacent area of the college mosque. In 1996, (?) A building was constructed for the residence of the principal on the west side of the college. Though a long time after the incident was abandoned, no principal lived in the building. On 08/12/2014, after joining as the Principal, Professor Mujahid started his first stay at the Billah Faruki building. After the building, he arranged for renovation and arranged for gas connections. He also arranged gas connections for research work in the Department of Chemistry. At the same time, Imam Sahib's mosque arrangements for gas connections were also made for the residence.

After the establishment of the college, several knowledgeable teachers and teachers from different parts of the country joined. As the reputation of the college flourished in their efforts, the education of the college continued to grow. After the establishment of the humanities and later the business section, it was approved to open the first science branch in 1964. Whose leading role was in the opening of the Science branch, he was the lecturer in the subject matter lecturer Muslim Uddin. Note that he later joined the Agricultural University and became acquainted with the Doctorate. In the name of Muslem Uddin. Approval of the introduction of degree (pass) courses in 1951 is available. Higher Bengali subjects were approved in the degree (pass) course. In 1992, honors courses were first introduced in Bangla and Management. Honors courses were introduced in 2001 in accounting, economics, and mathematics. Political Science, English, Philosophy, History, and Culture of Islam, Chemistry, and Honors courses for botany and zoology are available in 2005. In 2007, honors courses were introduced in the education of Islam, while the college's honors courses were introduced in 14teen subjects.

In 1995, in respect of Bangla and Management, Masters's Course in Political Science and Accounting was introduced in 1998. Then, in the long 17 years, no one took any initiative to open any other master' course. After completing the honors courses in this college, students had to go to Mymensingh, Tangail, or Dhaka for doing a Masters's course. After joining the Principal Professor Mujahid Billah Faruqi in 2014, it is possible to introduce 07 subjects (English, Economics, Botany, Zoology, Physics, Mathematics, and Chemistry) Masters course in 2015, in collaboration with the Honorable Jute and Textile Minister. On 17/01/2015, about 400 students from various subjects of honors and master's courses were given ceremonial crest honors at the college auditorium for inspiration for successful students.

In 2015, significant steps were taken for academic development. In the admission of the lowest quality GPA, the minimum GPA is set for admission in adverse effects of the results of the college. Nine multimedia classes were inaugurated together in 2015 to build a tailor-made student with an IT-based world. Gradually multimedia classes were started in all departments and each division was developed as a digital division. Considering the advantages of the students as well as education, bank booths were set up in the college to prevent the harassment of sending money to Pubali Bank in Bakultala and simultaneously providing the facility of the tuition fee with the help of mobile banking through e-cash. The milestone of another development has been established in 2015. This year, under the initiative of Professor Mujahid Billah Farooqi, the first female cadet in BNCC and the existing male platoon As well as in March 2018, another male platoon was approved. As additional cooperation, various organizations including ICT Club, Debate Club, Language Club, Ritter Parliament, and Sangskritik Jote were formed.

Since the establishment of the college, the beauty of the college has increased due to the initiative of different people at different times. Priorly mentioned in the efforts of Principal Habibur Rahman and Sujayat Ali Mia, the big pond was reformed and beautified. Basketball playgrounds were placed in the main street beside the building. There are still some memories of the field playing basketball ball. Former Principal Professor Anwar Hossain played an important role in beautifying the college. At the time of his college, the goal of the building was made for beauty-building, A clean and tidy layer is cleaned. After joining Prof. Mujahid Billah Faruqui, the work of beautifying is again visible. He brought the life of the building back to life through reform. In front of the college, removing the ruins of the old and abandoned building was an important role in its beauty. Especially, on 05/02/2013, in front of the Kalabhana, Dahibir Alhaj Ashik Mahmud Talukdar's mural was built and produced a great aesthetic artistic achievement.

In 1952, college students and teachers played an important role in the language movement. Professor Jahurul Huq of Bengal led the procession of the language movement. Even during the mass upsurge of 1969, college students remained silent. Among other teachers, Professor of Political Science, Sujayat Ali Miah, Professor Shashanka Shekhar Bhattacharya of History, Nasir Uddin Sarkar of philosophy, Professor Nurul Haque, Principal of the college A. H. M Abdul Kuddus was also involved in this movement. As a result of the agitation the dispute with the administration of the sub-division of the college was also seen, and on 3 November 1951, students protested against the administration's harassment activities. The students played an important role in the liberation war and the movement of ninety-nine. In 1963, after the efforts of Professor Sujayat Ali and the translator of the others, the first Shaheed Minar of Jamalpur was built on the north side of the college's main pond. Until the establishment of Shaheed Minar in Dayamaye in 1973, it was the central Shaheed Minar of Jamalpur. Since the participation of many students of the college in the great liberation war, the Pak army and the invading Badr forces formed torture cells in the college's degree hostel in 1971. Freedom fighters or ordinary people from various places were brought here and tortured here. One of the teachers who participated in the liberation war was Political Science Lecturer Dewan Habibullah and English department lecturer Abdul Hannan Khan. Both Dewan Habibullah and Abdul Hannan Khan later joined the Bangladesh Police Force as officers. Abdul Hannan Khan is currently working as the head of the investigation department of the International Court. Wartime Bengali lecturer Imamur Rashid was imprisoned in Jamalpur jail and he was discharged from the conspiracy of the anti-liberation faction. After four months of detention, he was released and got his job back. But the conspiracy against teachers of the Liberation War did not stop. In 1975, when Bangabandhu Sheikh Mujibur Rahman was killed by his family, Abdul Ghani of the controversial Chemistry lecturer Golam Rabbani, philosophy Mozammel Haque, Islamic History and Culture Department returned the job. In this context, Professor Imam Rashid of Bangla said, "This is an unprecedented event. There is still a mystery about how this impossible work has been done. "It is worth mentioning that only one of the principals who had been responsible for the establishment of the college was Md. Shafiqul Islam Akand was the hero of the freedom fighters. The college campus was the grassland of student politics. The students of different groups used to rally and the college ampalaya in the lecture. The role of student committees in various activities was also important.

The literature of the college is bearing important testimony on the anniversaries of the colleges from time to time. In addition to the writings of young writers in the anniversaries, the writings of many well-known professors are published. Starting from the partition, the language movement, the great liberation war, the popular upheaval of the ninety-nine, and the impact of almost every important event has been reflected in the anniversaries in many ways. Before 1967, eleven anniversaries were published by the college. Since the year of the establishment of the college in 1946, an anniversary was published every two years. Later, annually until 1997, the anniversary was published. The anniversary was also published from the college's Panaullah Ahmad Muslim Hostel. These anniversary writings were quite standard. The national poet's poetry, the lyricist, the authors, and many others have been published in these anniversaries. Khondakar Ashraf Hossain, Nazrul Islam Babu, Ishtiaq Pasha, Mahbubul Haque Shaheen, Habibur Rahman Habee, Professor Imamura Rashid, Prof. Mojibur Rahman, Professor Khaleda Raihan, Professor AKK M. Jawadul Haq, poet Ali Zahir, Ed. The writings of Muhammad Baki Billah were published in various anniversaries. Apart from this, the writings of many students of the free time have also given the anniversaries. In the year 1967, Khandakar Ashraf Hossain's poem 'Another world is in the darkness of the night is a unique general poem. The lyricist Nazrul Islam Babu published two wonderful stories named 'Sleep' and 'Vera 30, 00,000', on the anniversary of 1970 and 1972. Apart from this, he also had a poem named 'Asthya Train' in the next issue. The cover of the anniversaries was also beautiful. There are several painted painters, such as Biren Shome, in several paintings. The anniversary of 1991 and 1993 was 'Pratyay' and 'Shashi'. Besides, college anniversaries had no name; The college was published as an anniversary. Old numbers include memories of college, college activities, Jamalpur city printing press, studio, etc.

Honorable President of the People's Republic of Bangladesh Mr. Md. Abdul Hamid came to the 70th anniversary of the college as Chief Guest on 22 February 2016. On that occasion, the beautiful work of the college has been visible. In particular, the work of making the fields filled with water bodies, beautification of the Kula pond adjacent to the Shaheed Minar, the dismantling from the front of the college and the removal of unplanned use, and the renovation of all the buildings of the college has made the college visually appealing. In the development of the college, the present Principal Dr. Mujahid Billah Farooqi, and Jamalpur Minister of State for Minority Affairs Alhaj Mirza Azam, MP, including those who are not contributing at this time, it is commendable. Soon, the construction of a boundary wall of the college was done to protect the land, construct more hostels to eliminate the students' housing crisis, academic buildings including the construction of residential buildings for teachers and employees,

Department

Gallery

References
 Dear President, marking the 70th anniversary of the establishment of the college. The arrival of Abdul Hamid on 22 February 2016 in Souravornir

Organisations based in Jamalpur District
Colleges in Jamalpur District